Crataegus flabellata is a species of hawthorn known by the common name fanleaf hawthorn. It is native to the northeastern United States and adjacent Canada. It is intermediate in appearance between C. macrosperma and C. chrysocarpa. C. macrosperma, which occurs throughout the range of C. flabellata and also in the southeastern U.S., is often misidentified as C. flabellata.

Varieties
Crataegus crudelis Sarg. is a form of C. flabellata from Quebec that has very long thorns (up to 10 cm). The two varieties C. flabellata var. grayana (Eggl.) E.J. Palmer and C. flabellata, var. flabellata differ in that the first has 20 stamens per flower, and the latter has 10 stamens, but in other features the two varieties are variable and the features overlap.

References

flabellata
Trees of the Northeastern United States
Flora of North America
Flora without expected TNC conservation status